Montgomery County Community College (MCCC or Montco) is a public community college in Blue Bell in Montgomery County, Pennsylvania. MCCC also has two satellite locations, Pottstown Campus and Culinary Arts Institute in Lansdale. It is accredited by the Middle States Commission on Higher Education. Forbes ranked MCCC as one of Pennsylvania's top employers in 2019.

History
The College was founded in 1964 and offered classes from its campus in Conshohocken. In 1972, the school relocated to its current location in Blue Bell.

Locations

Blue Bell Campus
Located on 186, lush acres, the Blue Bell Campus provides a classic college setting, convenient location, cutting edge facilities and a top-notch education for its students.

Pottstown Campus
The Pottstown campus includes the North Hall, a  facility with classrooms, a computer lab and an art gallery. The building was formerly a knitting mill, brewery, and shoe polish factory until its renovation in 2006. It is connected to South Hall by an underpass that had been filled in since the early 1920s.

Municipal Police Academy
Located in Blue Bell, the Municipal Police Academy is a licensed by the Commonwealth of Pennsylvania.

The Culinary Arts Institute of Montgomery County Community College
Located in Towamencin Township, the Culinary Arts Institute opened in 2013.

Notable alumni
Alexis Cohen, American Idol contestant

References

External links
Official website
Official athletics website

Two-year colleges in the United States
Community colleges in Pennsylvania
Educational institutions established in 1964
Universities and colleges in Montgomery County, Pennsylvania
1964 establishments in Pennsylvania